The Luxgen S3 is a 5-seater subcompact sedan car produced by the Taiwanese car company Luxgen.

In 2020, Luxgen confirmed that both S3 and U5 were ceased production and would be relaunched as electric model.

Overview

The model is the first subcompact car of the brand and positioned under the Luxgen S5 compact sedan. It was styled by the Taiwanese HAITEC Design Center, and was previewed at the 2016 Taipei Auto Show as the Luxgen S3 EV+ concept. Luxgen S3 is the second sedan product of the Luxgen brand. It is equipped with 3D X-View+ 3D vision assist system, Active Eagle View+360 degree camera system, and the Side View+ camera system. The initial launch includes 5 trim levels and with the starting price around $17,000. No hatchback version have been developed, but a subcompact hatchback crossover based on the sedan called the Luxgen U5 has been introduced in 2017.

The MY2018 Luxgen S3 went on sale in January, 2018 in Taiwan. The new model features 6 air bags, ESC, TCS, HSA, and power adjust side mirrors in all trims. Other equipments include 12-inch display,  AR view+ system, and two-tone exterior.

EV+
The S3 EV+ also supports AC/DC chargers and can be charged up to 80% in 40 minutes.

References

S3
Cars introduced in 2016
2016 establishments in Taiwan
Front-wheel-drive vehicles
Subcompact cars
Sedans